Turks in Serbia, also referred to as Turkish Serbians and Serbian Turks, are people of Turkish ancestry present in Serbia. Turks have lived on this territory since the Ottoman period. The Turkish minority has traditionally lived in the urban areas of Serbia together with many Muslim Albanians; however, in 1830, when the Principality of Serbia was granted autonomy, most Turks emigrated as "muhacirs" (refugees) to Ottoman Turkey, and by 1862 almost all of the remaining Turks left Central Serbia, including 3,000 from Belgrade. According to the 2011 census only 647 people declared themselves as Turks, though this does not include the Turkish minority in Kosovo.

Notable people
Okan Demirok, first runner up of Best Model of Turkey (2016)
Hikmet Kıvılcımlı, Turkish communist leader, theoretician, writer, publicist, and translator. He was a founder of the Vatan Partisi (VP)
Yahya Kemal Beyatlı, Turkish poet, through his mother he is descended from Hafız Paşazade Mahmut Paşa from Niš. Also his great uncle Leskofçalı Galip was born in Leskovac, Serbia.
 , 19th century Ottoman Divan poet.
 , Turkish philosopher and writer.
Cevat Abbas Gürer, Turkish soldier, politician.
 , Turkish politician.
 , Turkish educator, writer, his family emigrated from Niš.

See also 

Serbia-Turkey relations
Serbs in Turkey
Turkish minorities in the former Ottoman Empire
Turks in the Balkans
Turks in Kosovo
Ottoman Empire
Ottoman architecture
Islam in Serbia

References

Bibliography 
 
 .

Serbia
Serbia
Middle Eastern diaspora in Serbia
 
Serbia
Ethnic groups in Serbia
Muslim communities in Europe
Serbia–Turkey relations